Gokula Krishna College Of Engineering (GKCE) is a college near Sullurupet  and the Satish Dhawan Space Centre in Nellore district in Andhra Pradesh state, India.  It provides undergraduate courses in engineering, pharmacy, diploma and postgraduate courses in MCA and Master of Business Administration.

It provides engineering qualifications in CSE, ECE, EEE, Mechanical engineering and Information Technology.

External links
Gokula Krishna College Of Engineering

Engineering colleges in Andhra Pradesh
Universities and colleges in Nellore district
Educational institutions in India with year of establishment missing